The 1995 St. Louis Rams season was the team's 58th year with the National Football League (NFL) and the first of 21 seasons in St. Louis.  They started the season at Busch Memorial Stadium before their new venue, the Trans World Dome, opened mid-season. The Rams looked to start their tenure in St. Louis strong by improving on their 4–12 record from 1994. In their first game in St. Louis, the Rams beat the New Orleans Saints, 17–13, and ultimately got off to a 4–0 start and looked poised to make a statement in the NFC. However, the team struggled later in the season. In week 8, the Rams were pounded, 44–10, by the dominant 49ers at home. Following this loss, the team could not recover, as they only won two more games for the remainder of the season. Ultimately, the Rams slumped to a 7–9 record and missed the playoffs for the sixth consecutive season. This would be the only time between 1990 and 1998 the Rams did not finish a season with double-digit losses.

Offseason

NFL Draft

Personnel

Staff

Roster

Regular season

Schedule

Standings

References

External links
 1995 St. Louis Rams at Pro-Football-Reference.com

St Louis Rams Season, 1995
St. Louis Rams seasons
St Lou